Shonette Azore-Bruce also simply known as Shonette Azore (born 8 July 1982) is a Barbadian netball player who represents Barbados internationally and plays in the positions of goal defense and goal keeper. She competed at the Netball World Cup on four occasions in 1999, 2011, 2015 and 2019. She also represented Barbados at the Commonwealth Games in 2014 and 2018.

References 

1982 births
Living people
Barbadian netball players
Netball players at the 2018 Commonwealth Games
Commonwealth Games competitors for Barbados
2019 Netball World Cup players